

See also 
 Lists of fossiliferous stratigraphic units in Asia
 Lists of fossiliferous stratigraphic units in Europe

References 
 

.
.
 Kazakhstan
 Kazakhstan
Fossiliferous stratigraphic units